Louis Hunt (9 November 1908 – 2002) was an English cricketer. He played first-class cricket for Bengal and Cambridge University.

See also
 List of Bengal cricketers
 List of Cambridge University Cricket Club players

References

External links
 

1908 births
2002 deaths
English cricketers
Bengal cricketers
Cambridge University cricketers
People from Prestatyn
Sportspeople from Denbighshire